Dáibhí Iarla Ó Cróinín (born 29 August 1954) is an Irish historian and authority on Hiberno-Latin texts, noted for his significant mid-1980s discovery in a manuscript in Padua of the "lost" Irish 84-year Easter table. Ó Cróinín was Professor of History at NUI Galway and Member of the Royal Irish Academy. He specialises in the history of Ireland, Britain and Europe during the Middle Ages and Hiberno-Latin texts.

Early life and education
Ó Cróinín received a B.A. in Early Irish History from University College Dublin (UCD) in 1975 and an M.Phil. in Medieval Studies from the same in 1977.

Academia
While wandering around Padua in the mid-1980s Ó Cróinín happened upon an example of the Irish 84-year Easter table in a manuscript there - this Easter table, so central to the Easter controversy, had until that time been presumed lost but Ó Cróinín had found one covering the period AD 438–521. For this he received his Ph.D. from University College Galway in 1985; the Pontifical Institute of Mediaeval Studies at the University of Toronto published Ó Cróinín's work on that seventh-century Hiberno-Latin computistical tract which he had discovered. Alongside Daniel McCarthy, Ó Cróinín published "The 'Lost' Irish 84-Year Easter Table Rediscovered" in the journal Peritia in the late 1980s, explaining the implications of his discovery for our understanding of the period.

Ó Cróinín succeeded Donnchadh Ó Corráin as editor of Peritia at some point in the mid-2010s.

Publications
A list of Ó Cróinín's books follows:
 The Irish Sex Aetates Mundi, Dublin (1982)
 Cummian's letter 'De controversia Paschali' together with a related Irish compustical tract 'De rationae conputanti''', edited with Maura Walsh (Pontifical Institute of Medieval Studies; Studies and texts, lxxxvi), Toronto (1988)
 An Cúigiú Díochlaonadh, Indreabhan, Connamara (1994)
 Early Medieval Ireland, 400–1200, London and New York (1995)
 The Songs of Elizabeth Cronin, Irish Traditional Singer, Dublin (2000)
 Early Irish History and Chronology, Dublin (2003)
 A New History of Ireland'', volume one, Dublin (2006)

Awards and honours
Ó Cróinín was awarded the Parnell Fellowship in Irish Studies at the University of Cambridge for the year 2017–18.

Personal life
His father was the scholar Donncha Ó Cróinín (1919–1990), and his paternal grandmother was the sean-nós singer Elizabeth Cronin (1879–1956).

References

External links
 Dáibhí Ó Cróinín  at NUI Galway
 Entry at the Bibliography of Irish Linguistics and Literature 1972-

1954 births
Living people
Academics of the University of Galway
Alumni of University College Dublin
Alumni of the University of Galway
Celtic studies scholars
Easter date
20th-century Irish historians
21st-century Irish historians
Irish-language writers
Members of the Royal Irish Academy
People from County Galway